Imperial Beach is a residential beach city in San Diego County, California, with a population of 26,324 at the 2010 census. The city is the southernmost city in California and the West Coast of the United States.

Geography
Imperial Beach is located at  (32.578255, -117.117111) making it the most southwesterly city in the continental United States. The city occupies the extreme southwest corner of the continental United States: bordered by Playas de Tijuana, Tijuana, Mexico to the south, Coronado, California and the San Diego Bay to the north, San Diego to the east, and the Pacific Ocean to the west.

Imperial Beach is located in San Diego County, the fifth most-populous county in the United States and part of the San Diego Metropolitan Area, the 17th largest metropolitan area in the United States with over 3 million people. It is also part of the San Diego – Tijuana metropolitan area, the largest bi-national metropolitan area shared between the United States and Mexico with over 5 million people.

History 

Imperial Beach sits on the traditional territory of the Kumeyaay people, who had established the village of Alyshuwii. Farmers and land owners from the Imperial Valley came to the area in the late 1880s seeking cooler weather during summer months. In March 1887, over 2,000 laborers descended upon nearby Coronado, California to construct the Hotel del Coronado, the largest resort in the world at the time. A large number of the workers stayed in Imperial Beach and some would later make it their permanent homestead. The city would incorporate in 1956, operating its own Mayor-council government providing city fire department service and policing by the formation of its own police department but eventually, years later, through the contracting of services through the San Diego County Sheriff's Office.

Imperial Beach has undergone a significant makeover in the last ten years to become more visitor-friendly and commercially viable. In 2004, the City of Imperial Beach began implementing a community redevelopment plan to improve the commercial corridor along Palm Avenue and Seacoast Drive. However, aside from a few smaller hotels, Imperial Beach remains a highly residential city with little hotel or motel accommodation for visitors. Future plans for the city allow for construction of additional hotels along the beach areas of Seacoast Drive. On September, 13, 2010, after many years of planning, demolition officially began on the old Seacoast Inn located off Seacoast Drive.  Construction of the new 22 million dollar hotel, now renamed Pier South Resort, a 78-room, four-story, upscale Mediterranean-style resort with restaurant, spa and conference facilities, was completed in December, 2013.

Climate
The city has a warm semi-arid climate (BSh), with summer temperatures often in the upper 70s °F (mid-20s °C) and winter temperatures in the 60s °F (15 to 20 °C). Because of the comfortable year-round temperatures, many homes in Imperial Beach are built without air conditioning. Imperial Beach often remains 10 degrees °F (5 degrees °C) cooler than inland areas of San Diego County in the summer, and 10 degrees warmer in the winter. The city is mostly or partly sunny 323 days of the year, with the wettest months in winter. The Farmers' Almanac consistently ranks the area within the Top 10 Best Weather Cities in America. The Scripps Institution of Oceanography operates a weather reporting station at the middle of the Imperial Beach Pier for sky condition, temperature, humidity, pressure, wind and water temperature data.

The record high temperature of 108 °F (42 °C) was observed on September 4, 1988, and September 27, 2010, while the record low of 26 °F (−3 °C) was observed on January 4, 1949.

Culture

Coastal and beach areas

Beach volleyball, surfing and body boarding are popular in Imperial Beach with activities concentrated north and south of the Imperial Beach Pier and the Boca Rio beach break, one of San Diego County's best surf spots. San Diego Magazine identifies the Boca Rio beach break as the second best surfing location in the county, second only to Black's Beach and the Scripps Canyon area near La Jolla. The area around Imperial Beach Pier known as Pier Plaza showcases plaques placed on surfboard benches that tell the story of how the city's big waves influenced surfing from 1937 to the 1950s. Nearby Border Field State Park signifies the southernmost beach on the west coast of the United States and allows beachgoers in America to speak through the fence with beachgoers in Mexico, where the beach is called Playas de Tijuana (Tijuana Beach). The city connects to nearby Coronado, California by way of the Silver Strand, a narrow, 7-mile-long (11 km) isthmus. Silver Strand State Beach, a popular beach for camping, bird watching, and bicycling, is located in the middle of the isthmus and includes both bay and ocean beaches.

The San Diego County summer tourist season brings many visitors to the city's beaches each year. For 31 years, Imperial Beach played home to the U.S. Open Sandcastle competition, the largest sand castle competition in the United States, drawing in approximately 325,000 people. The city held the final sand castle competition in August 2011, bringing an end to the annual event and tradition. The city also holds the beach front classic car show every summer and an annual dog-surfing contest. The Imperial Beach Farmer's Market, the only beachfront farmer's market in San Diego County, operates from Pier Plaza every Friday afternoon (from 2 PM - 6 PM November to March) and (from 2 PM - 7 PM April to October) offering local fruits, vegetables and community art. The South Bay Drive-in, the county's only ocean view drive-in theatre, is located just outside Imperial Beach off Coronado Avenue.

Imperial Beach is home to Tijuana River National Estuarine Research Reserve, a National Estuarine Research Reserve, and Border Field State Park. The estuary, located off Seacoast Drive and Imperial Beach Boulevard, is home to many endangered birds and wildlife. This estuary marks the place where the fresh water Tijuana River enters the salt water Pacific Ocean. It is the largest salt water marsh in Southern California.

Military presence
Imperial Beach has a large military population and is home to the US Navy's Naval Outlying Landing Field Imperial Beach also known as NOLF Imperial Beach. It is bordered on its northern extreme by Silver Strand Training Complex.

Crime
The San Diego County Sheriff's Department 2008 crime statistics rank Imperial Beach below the national average in all areas reported.

Transportation
San Diego Metropolitan Transit System (MTS) provides bus and paratransit services to the city from throughout San Diego County.

The city is one of five Port member cities making up the Port of San Diego, one of America's top 30 U.S. container ship ports.

In popular culture
Kem Nunn's novel, Tijuana Straits, provides insight into the culture of the border and surfing in Imperial Beach and the Tijuana River Valley, and the environmental problems that affect residents of Tijuana, Imperial Beach and Coronado.

The HBO television series John from Cincinnati  was about a dysfunctional surfing family in Imperial Beach set against the backdrop of the U.S.-Mexico border. The series (from Executive Producer David Milch, writer Kem Nunn, and director Mark Tinker) was filmed at a variety of locations in Imperial Beach and in the Tijuana River Valley.

On February 21, 2019, Vice News Tonight on HBO broadcast a segment from Imperial Beach about how an extreme tidal surge, known as king tide, affects the local population living along the Pacific coast.

Demographics

2010 census
The 2010 United States Census reported that Imperial Beach had a population of 26,324. The racial makeup of the city was 62.6% White (36.0% non-Hispanic White), 4.4% African American, 1.1% Native American, 6.6% Asian, 0.6% Pacific Islander, 18.1% Other and 6.6% Two or More Races. Hispanic or Latino of any race made up 49.0% of the population.

The Census reported that 25,705 people (97.6% of the population) lived in households, 619 (2.4%) lived in non-institutionalized group quarters, and 0 (0%) were institutionalized.

The population was spread out, with 6,696 people (25.4%) under the age of 18, 3,640 people (13.8%) aged 18 to 24, 7,603 people (28.9%) aged 25 to 44, 6,012 people (22.8%) aged 45 to 64, and 2,373 people (9.0%) who were 65 years of age or older. Imperial Beach has one of the youngest median ages of any Southern California city with a median age of 31 years. For every 100 females, there were 101.1 males. For every 100 females age 18 and over, there were 99.5 males.

The homeowner vacancy rate was 2.3%; the rental vacancy rate was 5.4%. 7,476 people (28.4% of the population) lived in owner-occupied housing units and 18,229 people (69.2%) lived in rental housing units.

According to estimates by the San Diego Association of Governments, the median household income of Imperial Beach in 2010 was $49,104 (not adjusted for inflation).

Government

Notable people 
 California Congressman Brian Bilbray grew up in Imperial Beach. Bilbray graduated from Mar Vista High School in 1970.
 Serge Dedina is the mayor of Imperial Beach as well as the director of environmental organization Wildcoast.
 Software entrepreneur Charlie Jackson grew up in Imperial Beach and graduated Mar Vista High in 1967.
 Film actor Matthew Modine attended high school in Imperial Beach.
 Eleanor Mariano, retired USN Rear Admiral and physician to the President of the United States at the White House for 9 years.
 Marco Minnemann drummer
Travis Ryan, vocalist of Deathgrind band Cattle Decapitation and Grindcore band Murder Construct.
Aaron Chang, award-winning American photographer specializing in surfing and ocean photography. He moved to Imperial Beach at age 11 and stayed there until after high school graduation. He went on to become Senior Photographer for Surfing Magazine for over 25 years. He currently resides in San Diego County, operating two galleries featuring his work.
Allen "Dempsey" Holder, was a pioneering surfer in the San Diego, California South County area. He is noted for riding the large surf of the Tijuana Sloughs and he headed up the Imperial Beach lifeguard services for many years. The local public safety/lifeguard facility is named in his honor.

See also
 List of beaches in San Diego County
 List of California state parks

References

External links

Imperial Beach Chamber of Commerce
The City of Imperial Beach
Imperial Beach Eagle and Times

 
Cities in San Diego County, California
Incorporated cities and towns in California
Mexico–United States border crossings
San Diego metropolitan area
South Bay (San Diego County)
Populated coastal places in California
Beaches of San Diego County, California
Beaches of Southern California
Surfing locations in California
History of Imperial County, California